Asteriognatha cyclocentra is a species of moth of the family Tortricidae. It is found on Sumatra.

References

Archipini
Moths described in 1983
Moths of Indonesia
Taxa named by Alexey Diakonoff